Sarkofagen Mountain is a somewhat isolated mountain in Arctic, around 11 nautical miles (20 km) south of Mount Yakovlev in the Russkiye Mountains of Queen Maud Land. Mapped by Norsk Polarinstitutt from air photos taken by Norwegian Arctic Expedition, 1958–59, and named Sarkofagen (the sarcophagus).

Mountains of Queen Maud Land
Princess Astrid Coast